The 1956 United States Senate election in Florida was held on November 6, 1956. Incumbent Democratic U.S. Senator George Smathers won re-election to a second term.

Smathers' victory in the May 8 primary was tantamount to election, as the Republican Party did not field a candidate for this election. This election was the last Senate election in Florida in which the Republicans did not field a candidate.

Democratic primary

Candidates 
Erle L. Griffis, attorney
George Smathers, incumbent U.S. Senator

Results

General election

Results

See also 
 1956 United States Senate elections

References

Bibliography

Single-candidate elections
1956
Florida
United States Senate